A list of films produced in France in 1987.

Notes

External links
 1987 in France
 1987 in French television
 French films of 1987 at the Internet Movie Database
French films of 1987 at Cinema-francais.fr

1987
Films
Lists of 1987 films by country or language